Anthony Solomon may refer to:

 Anthony M. Solomon (1919–2008), American economist
 Anthony Solomon (basketball) (born 1964), American college basketball coach